Treet Corporation is a Pakistani personal care company which makes shaving products. It is based in Lahore, Pakistan.

History
Treet Corporation was founded and owned by Syed Muratib Ali family.

It is listed on the Pakistan Stock Exchange.

Company products
Conventional and disposable razors (personal shaving products)
Lead acid batteries (Daewoo brand batteries)
Corrugated boxes for packaging

References

Manufacturing companies based in Lahore
Companies listed on the Pakistan Stock Exchange
Pakistani brands
Ali family
Manufacturing companies established in 1977
Conglomerate companies of Pakistan
Pakistani companies established in 1977